The Malagasy serotine (Laephotis matroka),  is a species of vesper bat. It is found only in Madagascar. It was formerly classified in Neoromicia before phylogenetic analysis found it to belong to Laephotis.

References

Laephotis
Taxonomy articles created by Polbot
Bats of Africa
Taxa named by Oldfield Thomas
Mammals described in 1905
Taxobox binomials not recognized by IUCN